The Mignery Sculpture Garden is a sculpture garden in Bartlett, Nebraska. The 39 statues on the grounds of the Wheeler County Courthouse were designed by Herb Mignery, and the structure is "one of the largest displays of bronze statues" in the United States.

References

Bronze sculptures in Nebraska
Buildings and structures in Wheeler County, Nebraska
Sculpture gardens, trails and parks in the United States